Andrew Thomas Halls (born 20 April 1992) is an English footballer who plays as a defender for Chorley.

Club career

Stockport County
Born in Urmston, Greater Manchester, Halls made his first team debut for Stockport County on 11 April 2009 as part of a 1–0 defeat to Leeds United. In May 2011 he was offered a new one-year deal by the club which the club announced he had signed in July 2011.

He was offered a further deal by the club in May 2012.
Halls scored his first professional goal in a 4–3 defeat against Southport on 1 December 2012.

Macclesfield Town
On 17 August 2013 Halls signed for Conference National side Macclesfield Town after being released by Stockport at the end of the previous season.

Later career

Following his departure from Macclesfield, Halls played joined Chester. He signed for Guiseley in July 2018 but left the club in May 2019. He subsequently signed for Curzon Ashton before joining Chorley. On 31 December 2021, he was sent out on a one-month, loan to Northern Premier League Premier Division side F.C. United of Manchester so that he could regain fitness after an injury lay-off.

Career statistics

Club

Honours
Macclesfield Town
FA Trophy runner-up: 2016–17

References

External links

1992 births
Living people
People from Urmston
English footballers
Association football defenders
Stockport County F.C. players
Macclesfield Town F.C. players
Chester F.C. players
Guiseley A.F.C. players
Curzon Ashton F.C. players
Chorley F.C. players
F.C. United of Manchester players
English Football League players
National League (English football) players
Northern Premier League players